Leigh Green is a hamlet  southeast of the town of Tenterden in Kent, England .

Hamlets in Kent
Tenterden